Ninive may refer to:

 Nineveh, an ancient Assyrian city in Iraq
 Ninive, a village in Herrnhut municipality, Germany

